Maloides is a genus of South Pacific tangled nest spiders containing the single species, Maloides cavernicola. It was  first described by Norman I. Platnick in 1989, and has only been found in New Zealand.

References

Amaurobiidae
Monotypic Araneomorphae genera
Spiders of New Zealand
Taxa named by Raymond Robert Forster